Orestes Glacier is a narrow glacier within Orestes Valley, aligned along the valley's north wall, in the Olympus Range, Victoria Land. Named after the valley by Advisory Committee on Antarctic Names (US-ACAN) in 1997.

Glaciers of Victoria Land
McMurdo Dry Valleys